La Quinta High School (LQHS) is a public high school located in Westminster, Orange County, California, is one of seven high-schools of the Garden Grove Unified School District.

History
La Quinta High School was founded in 1963, "the fifth" high school to be founded in the Garden Grove Unified School District. In the late 1980s and early 1990s, La Quinta gained notoriety for expressed racial tensions between those of Asian and Hispanic/Latino descent. In 1994, La Quinta was known for a tuberculosis outbreak of 106 students and faculty who tested positive, and subsequent quick response and compliance with county public health officials.  In 2009, La Quinta again made headlines for student demonstrations in support of a teacher allegedly abused by the high school's administration.

Administration and organization
The La Quinta mascot is an Aztec. La Quinta's current principal is Adrian Lucero.

The structure of the school is divided into seven main buildings as well as several portable classrooms. To the north of campus are the 100, 200 and 300 buildings. The 100 building holds most english classrooms, the 200 is mostly social science classrooms and 300 building specializes in world languages and special education. To the east are the 600 building for art, business and Vietnamese, 700 building for science classes, and the 800 building which houses most of the math classes. The 400 building to the south houses weight rooms and classrooms for miscellaneous subjects, such as art, music, band and computer graphics. The 500 buildings, which are seven portable rooms to the south of the 400 building and west of the gym, house mainly social science classrooms. Students traverse the campus through the space between buildings, known as "the quad." The student store, located in the 100 building, is the center of the school's activities.  The school library and performing arts center are on the west side of the campus. In front of the library is the cafeteria. The gym and pool facility are to the south of the 500 portables.

The fields south and west of the main campus have courts for sports such as basketball, soccer, track and field, tennis, football, softball and baseball.

Student body
There are about 2,150 students, grades 9th-12th, who reside in Westminster, Garden Grove, Fountain Valley, and Santa Ana. La Quinta’s student demographic breakdown is as follows; 80% of the students are Asian, 13% Hispanic, 4% White, and 1% other races representing approximately 26 different home languages. The class of 2018 sent approximately 90% of its graduates to higher education; 45% to four-year colleges and 64% to two-year colleges.

Academics
La Quinta High School offers many Advanced Placement classes. AP classes, if mastered, will give students college credit in that course.  Mastery is determined by a score on the AP tests given in May. A score of 3, 4, or 5 allows the student to gain college credit. La Quinta offers the following AP classes: 
English 
AP English Literature and Composition 
AP English Language and Composition 
Math 
AP Calculus AB 
AP Calculus BC 
AP Statistics 
Sciences 
AP Computer Science Principles 
AP Computer Science A 
AP Physics 1 
AP Physics 2 
AP Biology 
AP Chemistry 
AP Environmental Science 
World Languages 
AP Spanish Language and Culture 
AP French Language and Culture 
Social Sciences 
AP World History: Modern 
AP United States History 
AP Psychology 
AP Macroeconomics 
AP U.S. Government and Politics 
AP Human Geography 
Arts 
AP Music Theory

Athletics
La Quinta High School consists the following sports.

Current sports
 Baseball
 Basketball
 Cheerleading
 Cross Country
 Dance
 Football
 Soccer
 Softball
 Swimming
 Tennis
 Track
 Volleyball
 Water Polo

Former sports
 Badminton 
 Golf
 Wrestling
 Field Hockey

Music Department
La Quinta High School has an award-winning marching band, known as the La Quinta High School Marching Aztecs. Their most recent show is titled "The Looming Threat" (2020), and past shows include "When No One Is Watching" (2019), "A Place in My Daydream" (2019), "State of Mind" (2018), "Going Home" (2018), "Where the Clouds Dance" (2017), "Tribal Affect" (2016), "Sacred Geometry of Chance" ft. "The Gambler" (2015), "The Machine" ft. Mechanize (2014), "Playback" (2013), "One" (2012), "Heroes" (2011), "Ex Astris Scientia" (2010), "Fantasmic" (2009), "Pyramids of Egypt" (2008), "Pirates" (2007), "Cowboys" (2006), "La Nouba" (2005), "Pearl Harbor" (2004), "Jesus Christ, Superstar" (2003), "Circle of Life" (2002), "Cabaret" (2001), & "Salute to John Williams" (2000). The band competes in Class 3A of the WBA (Western Band Association) circuit as of 2017 and placed 4th overall in the 2017 WBA Grand Championships for classes 1A, 2A, and 3A. They have previously competed in Class 5A of the SCJA (Southern California Judging Association) circuit and advanced to the California State Band Championships from 2010 to 2014. They have earned second place (overall band) and high percussion in Division 4A at the CSBC (California State Band Championships) in 2013 and continued on to earn fourth place (overall) with both high percussion and high auxiliary for the first time in Division 5A in 2014. In 2017, La Quinta's Drumline made it to SCPA (Southern California Performing Arts) Finals for the first time and achieved second place. The year after, they won first place with their show "Going Home", with an overall score of 93.8375.

Along with Marching and Symphonic Band, La Quinta High School offers other music classes such as Concert Choir and String Orchestra.
The Vocal Ensemble and the Zero Period Advanced Orchestra have earned Superior ratings at festivals throughout Southern California.

Electives

La Quinta has two elective departments:  Fine Arts and Business.  Fine arts students win numerous awards each year for their projects. La Quinta has one of the largest Business departments in Orange County, California; it offers classes to obtain either an Accounting Certificate or Business Ownership Certificate as a supplement to college applications or resumes.

Notable alumni
Brent Kutzle, American musician best known for playing the bass guitar and cello for the band OneRepublic
Bobby Crosby, former Major League Baseball (MLB) shortstop
Brandon Laird, former MLB third baseman for the New York Yankees & Houston Astros, currently playing for the Chiba Lotte Marines
Gerald Laird, MLB catcher who is currently a free agent
Ian Kennedy, MLB pitcher for the Kansas City Royals
Ian Stewart, former MLB third baseman
Joon Park, Korean-American singer, actor and leader of the Korean pop group g.o.d
Christian Ramirez, professional soccer player
Jamie Subandhi, Olympic badminton player
Oscar Munoz, CEO, United Airlines

References

External links

Official site of school
School Report Card
Garden Grove Unified School District
Orange County Department of Education
 La Quinta High School API Score
 County Schools API Scores
 CIF Southern Section
 Maxpreps LQHS

Educational institutions established in 1963
High schools in Orange County, California
Public high schools in California
Westminster, California
1963 establishments in California